Jobet Kalakh  is a Syrian village located in Masyaf Nahiyah in Masyaf District, Hama.  According to the Syria Central Bureau of Statistics (CBS), Jobet Kalakh had a population of 103 in the 2004 census.

References 

Populated places in Masyaf District